Shelstad is a surname. Notable people with the surname include:

Brad Shelstad (born 1952), American ice hockey player
Diana Shelstad (born 1947), Australian mathematician